Victoria Danilchenko (1 November 1969, Moscow, USSR) is Russian lawyer and television presenter.

Education 

In 1992, Victoria Danilchenko graduated from the faculty of law of the Lomonosov Moscow State University; thesis “Legal status of joint ventures in the RSFSR”.

Lawyer 

Danilchenko started her career in the legal consultation of the Moscow City Bar Association.

Since 2003, she is the member of the Moscow Chamber of Advocates.

In 2007, she moved to the law office of Heifetz & partners. Since 2010, she has been the Chairman of the Pavel Astakhov Bar Association.

Since 2019, Danilchenko is the Founder and Chairman of the Victoria Danilchenko Bar Association.

Victoria Danilchenko specializes in civil and criminal law, family relations, children's rights and arbitration.

Cases 

 Alyosha Shimko
 Artem Saveliev
 Irina Bergset
 Yulia Kolkova

Television career 

Since 2010, Victoria Danilchenko has been the host of the program On Juvenile Affairs on the Domashny channel.

Educator 

Since 2017, Danilchenko has been teaching at the Moscow State Institute of International Relations.

References

External links 
 

Living people
1969 births
Lawyers from Moscow
Russian television presenters
Russian women lawyers
Russian women television presenters